The Grand Duchy of Flandrensis (Dutch:  Groothertogdom Flandrensis) is a micronation with claims over some territories of Antarctica, which was founded in 2008 by the Belgian Niels Vermeersch. Flandrensis is not recognised by any country or government, nor is it their intention to be recognized as a country. Since 2021 the micronation is registered in Belgium as the environmental non-profit organization “vzw Groothertogdom Flandrensis”.

History
The Grand Duchy of Flandrensis was founded on September 4, 2008 as a temporary hobby for 2 weeks. The Micronation is inspired by the medieval County of Flanders (Pagus Flandrensis). Flandrensis was firstly regarded by the founder as a hobby-micronation, later as an ecological venture, to raise awareness on ice melting and climate change. and since 2021 the micronation is also an environmental non-profit organization. 

The micronation has its own identity cards, currency, heraldry, newspaper, constitution and national anthem. Until 2014 Flandrensis was partly a political simulation with political parties like the APPF (pirate party), DRP (royalist), NPF (nationalist), FDUP (unionist), FL-AL (solidarity), Lijst Govaert (liberal) and L&S (republican) and organised yearly elections. Professor Alastair Bonnett of the University of Newcastle described Flandrensis as an example of a micronation that is inspired by a city council in which young people learn to make decisions.

In 2021 the micronation was composed of 741 citizens from 71 different nationalities.  Outside the internet the activities of Flandrensis were restricted to the region around Roeselare but the official embassy is located in the West-Flemish town Sint-Juliaan.  Flandrensis had also a Commonwealth that united only Dutch-speaking micronations: the Grand Duchy of Flandrensis, the Principality of Arkel and the Duchy of Campinia (disbanded in 2016).

Territory
Flandrensis is regarded by the founder as an ecological venture, to raise awareness on ice melting. Flandrensis has no intentions to visit their claims.

National symbols 
The flag of Flandrensis is inspired by the first Belgian flag of 1830. The original Belgian flag's yellow band has been replaced by white which symbolises a new beginning. For the same reason there are also two lions on the coat of arms, based on the Flemish lion.

Non profit organization 
On August 12, 2021 Flandrensis was registered in the Belgian Official Journal as “vzw Groothertogdom Flandrensis”. In the published bylaws Flandrensis describes themselves as an environmental non-profit organization that focuses on climate change and Antarctica, using the concept of micronationalism to draw attention to climate in a creative way.   Some of their projects are climate letters and clean-up actions.

See also 
 List of micronations
 Flags of micronations
 List of Antarctic territorial claims

References

External links
Official website
Grand Duchy of Flandrensis on MicroWiki

West Antarctica micronations
States and territories established in 2008
Marie Byrd Land
Environmental organisations based in Belgium